This is a list of schools in Manchester, England.

In 2010, the Manchester Local Education Authority was ranked last out of Greater Manchester's ten LEAs – and 147th out of 150 in the country LEAs – based on the percentage of pupils attaining at least five A*–C grades at General Certificate of Secondary Education (GCSE) including maths and English (38.6 per cent compared with the national average of 50.7 per cent). The LEA also had the highest occurrence of absences, with 11.11 per cent of "half day sessions missed by pupils", above the national average of 5.8 per cent. Of the schools in the LEA with 30 or more pupils, four had 90 per cent or more pupils achieving at least five A*–C grades at GCSE including maths and English (Manchester High School for Girls, St Bede's College, Manchester Islamic High School for Girls, and The King David High School) while three managed 25 per cent or below (Plant Hill Arts College, North Manchester High School for Boys, Brookway High School and Sports College).

State-funded schools

Primary schools

Abbey Hey Primary Academy, Gorton
Abbott Community Primary School, Collyhurst
Abraham Moss Community School, Crumpsall
Acacias Community Primary School, Burnage
All Saints CE Primary School, Newton Heath
All Saints Primary School, Gorton
Alma Park Primary School, Levenshulme
Armitage CE Primary School, Ardwick
Ashbury Meadow Primary School, Beswick
Baguley Hall Primary School, Baguley
Barlow Hall Primary School, Chorlton-cum-Hardy
Beaver Road Primary School, Didsbury
Benchill Primary School, Wythenshawe
Birchfields Primary School, Fallowfield
Bowker Vale Primary School, Higher Crumpsall
Briscoe Lane Academy, Newton Heath
Broad Oak Primary School, East Didsbury
Brookburn Community School, Chorlton-cum-Hardy
Button Lane Primary School, Northern Moor
Cavendish Primary School, West Didsbury
Chapel Street Community Primary School, Levenshulme
Charlestown Community Primary School, Blackley
Cheetham CE Community Academy, Cheetham Hill
Cheetwood Primary School, Cheetham Hill
Chorlton CE Primary School, Chorlton-cum-Hardy
Chorlton Park Primary, Chorlton-cum-Hardy
Christ The King RC Primary School, Newton Heath
Claremont Primary School, Moss Side
CE School of The Resurrection, Beswick
Co-op Academy Broadhurst, Moston
Crab Lane Primary School, Higher Blackley
Cravenwood Primary Academy, Crumpsall
Cringle Brook Primary School, Levenshulme
Crossacres Primary Academy, Wythenshawe
Crosslee Community Primary School, Blackley
Crowcroft Park Primary School, Longsight
Crumpsall Lane Primary School, Crumpsall
Didsbury CE Primary School, Didsbury
The Divine Mercy RC Primary School, Rusholme
E-ACT Blackley Academy, Blackley
Gorton Primary School, Gorton
Green End Primary School, Burnage
Haveley Hey Community School, Benchill
Heald Place Primary School, Rusholme
Higher Openshaw Community School, Higher Openshaw
Holy Name RC Primary School, Moss Side
Holy Trinity CE Primary School, Blackley
Irk Valley Community School, Lower Crumpsall
King David Primary School, Crumpsall
Ladybarn Primary School, Withington
Lily Lane Primary School, Moston
Longsight Community Primary, Longsight
Manchester Communications Primary Academy, Harpurhey
Manley Park Primary School, Whalley Range
Mauldeth Road Primary School, Withington
Medlock Primary School, Ardwick / Chorlton-on-Medlock
Moston Fields Primary School, Moston
Moston Lane Community Primary School, Moston
Mount Carmel RC Primary School, Blackley
New Islington Free School, Ancoats
New Moston Primary School, New Moston
Newall Green Primary School, Wythenshawe
Northenden Community School, Northenden
Oasis Academy Aspinal, Gorton
Oasis Academy Harpur Mount, Harpurhey
Oasis Academy Temple, Cheetham Hill
Old Hall Drive Academy, Gorton
Old Moat Primary School, Withington
Oswald Road Primary School, Chorlton-cum-Hardy
Our Lady's RC Primary School, Whalley Range
Park View Community Primary, Miles Platting
Peel Hall Primary School, Wythenshawe
Pike Fold Primary School, Blackley
Plymouth Grove Primary School, Chorlton-on-Medlock
Rack House Primary School, Northern Moor
Ravensbury Community School, Clayton
Ringway Primary School, Wythenshawe
Rolls Crescent Primary School, Hulme
Rushbrook Primary Academy, Gorton
Sacred Heart RC Primary School, Baguley
Sacred Heart RC Primary School, Gorton
St Agnes CE Primary School, Longsight
St Aidan's RC Primary School, Northern Moor
St Ambrose RC Primary School, Chorlton-cum-Hardy
St Andrew's CE Primary School, Levenshulme
St Anne's RC Primary School, Ancoats
St Anne's RC Primary School, Crumpsall
St Anthony's RC Primary School, Wythenshawe
St Augustine's CE Primary School, Monsall
St Barnabas CE Primary Academy, Openshaw
St Bernard's RC Primary School, Burnage
St Brigid's RC Primary School, Beswick
St Catherine's RC Primary School, Didsbury
St Chad's RC Primary School, Cheetham Hill
St Chrysostom's CE Primary School, Chorlton-on-Medlock
St Clare's RC Primary School, Higher Blackley
St Clement's CE Primary School, Higher Openshaw
St Cuthbert's RC Primary School, Withington
St Dunstan's RC Primary School, Moston
St Edmund's RC Primary School, Miles Platting
St Elizabeth's RC Primary School, Wythenshawe
St Francis RC Primary School, Gorton
St James' CE Primary School, Birch-in-Rusholme
St James' CE Primary School, Gorton
St John Bosco RC Primary School, Blackley
St John's RC Primary School, Chorlton-cum-Hardy
St John's CE Primary School, Longsight
St Joseph's RC Primary School, Longsight
St Kentigern's RC Primary School, Fallowfield
St Luke's CE Primary School, Longsight
St Malachy's RC Primary School, Collyhurst
St Margaret Mary's RC Primary School, New Moston
St Margaret's CE Primary School, Whalley Range
St Mary's CE Junior and Infant School, Moss Side
St Mary's CE Primary School, Moston
St Mary's RC Primary School, Levenshulme
St Patrick's RC Primary School, Collyhurst
St Paul's CE Primary School, Withington
St Peter's RC Primary School, Newall Green
St Philip's CE Primary School, Hulme
St Richard's RC Primary School, Longsight
St Wilfrid's CE Junior and Infant School, Newton Heath
St Wilfrid's CE Primary School, Northenden
St Wilfrid's RC Primary School, Hulme
St Willibrord's RC Primary School, Clayton
SS John Fisher and Thomas More Catholic Primary School, Benchill
Sandilands Primary School, Wythenshawe
Saviour CE Primary School, Collyhurst
Seymour Road Academy, Clayton
Stanley Grove Primary Academy, Longsight
Unity Community Primary, Crumpsall / Cheetham Hill
Varna Community Primary School, Openshaw
Webster Primary School, Moss Side
West Didsbury CE Primary School, West Didsbury
Wilbraham Primary School, Fallowfield
William Hulme's Grammar School, Whalley Range
The Willows Primary School, Wythenshawe

Secondary schools

Abraham Moss Community School, Crumpsall
The Barlow RC High School, East Didsbury
Burnage Academy for Boys, Burnage
Cedar Mount Academy, Gorton
Chorlton High School, Chorlton-cum-Hardy
CHS South, Chorlton-cum-Hardy
Co-op Academy Belle Vue, Openshaw
Co-op Academy Manchester, Higher Blackley
Co-op Academy North Manchester, Blackley
Dean Trust Ardwick, Ardwick
Didsbury High School, West Didsbury
Dixons Brooklands Academy, Wythenshawe
The East Manchester Academy, Beswick
Eden Boys' Leadership Academy, Crumpsall / Cheetham Hill
Eden Girls' Leadership Academy, Crumpsall / Cheetham Hill
King David High School, Crumpsall 
Levenshulme High School, Levenshulme
Loreto High School, Chorlton-cum-Hardy
Manchester Academy, Moss Side
Manchester Communication Academy, Harpurhey
Manchester Enterprise Academy, Wythenshawe
Manchester Enterprise Academy Central, Levenshulme
Our Lady's RC High School, Higher Blackley
Parrs Wood High School, East Didsbury
St Matthew's RC High School, Moston
St Paul's RC High School, Newall Green
St Peter's RC High School, Longsight
Trinity CE High School, Hulme
Whalley Range High School, Whalley Range
William Hulme's Grammar School, Whalley Range
Wright Robinson College, Gorton

Special and alternative schools

Ashgate Specialist Support Primary School, Wythenshawe
The Birches School, West Didsbury
Bridgelea Pupil Referral Unit, Withington
Camberwell Park Specialist Support School, Moston
Grange School, Gorton
Lancasterian School, West Didsbury
Manchester Hospital School, Chorlton-on-Medlock
Manchester Secondary PRU, Chorlton-cum-Hardy
Meade Hill School, Higher Blackley
Melland High School, Gorton
North Ridge High School, Blackley
Pioneer House High School, Northern Moor
Piper Hill High School, Newall Green
Prospect House Specialist Support Primary School, Gorton
Rodney House School, Longsight
Southern Cross School, Chorlton-cum-Hardy

Further education
Co-operative College, Manchester
Connell Sixth Form College, Beswick
Loreto College, Hulme
Royal Northern College of Music, Chorlton-on-Medlock
The Manchester College, Ardwick / Spinningfields / Harpurhey / Openshaw / West Didsbury / Northenden / Wythenshawe
Xaverian College, Rusholme

Independent schools

Primary and preparatory schools
Manchester Muslim Preparatory School, Withington
Moor Allerton Preparatory School, West Didsbury

Senior and all-through schools

Abbey College, Manchester city centre
Chetham's School of Music, Manchester city centre
Etz Chaim Boys School, Crumpsall
Kassim Darwish Grammar School for Boys, Chorlton-cum-Hardy
King of Kings School, Manchester city centre
Manchester Grammar School, Rusholme
Manchester High School for Girls, Fallowfield
Manchester Islamic High School for Girls, Chorlton-cum-Hardy
St Bede's College, Whalley Range
Sol Christian Academy, Piccadilly
TLG Manchester, Harpurhey
Withington Girls' School, Fallowfield

Special and alternative schools

The Greens ENS, Newton Heath
Harpurhey Alternative Provision School, Harpurhey
IncludED, Whalley Range
Manchester Jewish School for Special Education, Cheetham Hill
Manchester Vocational and Learning Academy, Levenshulme
Manchester Young Lives, Wythenshawe
Music Stuff, Openshaw
Progress Schools, Gorton
TLG Manchester, Harpurhey

Further education

Communicate School, Manchester

References

 Manchester City Council Schoolfinder
 Ofsted (Office for Standards in Education)
 Schools in Manchester Data provided by EduBase public portal - The Department for Education

 
Manchester